Paweł Tarnowski (born 28 June 1990) is a Polish professional footballer who plays as a midfielder for Polonia Warsaw.

References

External links
 
 
 

1990 births
Living people
Polish footballers
Association football midfielders
Ekstraklasa players
I liga players
II liga players
III liga players
Radomiak Radom players
Jagiellonia Białystok players
Polonia Warsaw players
Ząbkovia Ząbki players
Znicz Pruszków players
Podbeskidzie Bielsko-Biała players
People from Radom
Sportspeople from Masovian Voivodeship